Clarence Zebras Football Club is a soccer club based in the City of Clarence, Tasmania, which was formed in September of 2019 as a result of the amalgamation of Clarence United FC and Hobart Zebras FC. They compete in the NPL Tasmania, the second tier of the sport in the country below the A-League. The club also has women's teams, including in the highest division in Tasmania the Women's Super League, and teams in all youth divisions. 

Clarence Zebras play their home games at Wentworth Park, a multiple pitch venue located alongside Howrah Beach in the Clarence, Tasmania with good quality playing surfaces and club facilities.

History
The club was founded in 2019, as a result of the amalgamation of Clarence United FC and Hobart Zebras FC.

Players

Current squad

Coaching staff

National Premier League Tasmania
 Head coach: Franco Previdi
 Technical director: Brett Pullen
 Assistant: John Moutsatsos
 Goalkeeper Coach: Alex Tatnell

Women's Super League
 Coach: Adam Powell

Seasons - men

References

2019 establishments in Australia
Association football clubs established in 2019
Soccer clubs in Tasmania